Thomas Taylor, commonly known as Tommy Taylor, is an Irish former footballer who played as a goalkeeper, and briefly as a centre-forward, and made one appearance for the Republic of Ireland national team.

Career
Taylor made his first and only international appearance for the Republic of Ireland on 5 October 1958 in a friendly against Poland, coming on as a 68th-minute substitute for Jimmy O'Neill. The home match, which was played at Dalymount Park in Dublin, finished as a 2–2 draw with Taylor not conceding while in goal.

In early 1959, Taylor moved to Malta for his job with an Irish construction firm, and subsequently joined Valletta. He began his career at Valletta as a centre-forward, but shortly later returned to his usual position as goalkeeper, playing for the club until mid-1974 when he returned to Ireland.

Career statistics

International

Honours
Waterford
 League of Ireland: 1965–66
 Munster Senior Cup: 1955–56, 1956–57, 1965–66, 1966–67

Valletta
 Maltese First Division: 1958–59, 1959–60, 1962–63
 Maltese FA Trophy: 1959–60, 1963–64
 Cassar Cup: 1958–59
 Scicluna Cup: 1961, 1964

References

External links
 

Year of birth missing (living people)
Living people
Association footballers from Dublin (city)
Republic of Ireland association footballers
Republic of Ireland international footballers
Republic of Ireland expatriate association footballers
Irish expatriate sportspeople in Malta
Expatriate footballers in Malta
Association football goalkeepers
Association football forwards
Home Farm F.C. players
Waterford F.C. players
Valletta F.C. players
League of Ireland players
Maltese Premier League players